Nedre Roasten is a lake in Femundsmarka National Park on the border of Innlandet and Trøndelag counties in Norway. The  lake sits on the border of the municipalities of Engerdal in Innlandet county and Røros in Trøndelag county.

See also
List of lakes in Norway

References

	

Lakes of Innlandet
Lakes of Trøndelag
Røros